The Chinese Soviet Republic National Bank was a bank established by the Chinese Communist Party-controlled Chinese Soviet Republic in the Republic of China. Its governor was Mao Zemin, the younger brother of Mao Zedong. It was involved in providing mortgage, loaning, saving, billing, and government bond services, and was responsible for issuing banknotes and coins in the CCP's controlled territory from 1932 to 1937.

History 
The bank was established established in Ruijin, Jiangxi, on 1 February 1932. From 1935 to 1936 it was gradually moved to Shanbei along with the Red Army and renamed to the Chinese Soviet Republic National Bank – Northwest Branch. Following the creation of the Second United Front and the dissolution of the CSR in the aftermath of the Sian Incident, the bank was renamed to the Shensi-Kansu-Ninghsia Border Area Bank in 1937.

References

Defunct banks of China
Banks established in 1932
1937 disestablishments
History of the Chinese Communist Party
Jiangxi
Chinese Soviet Republic